Industrija Motora Rakovica (abbr. IMR) was an agricultural machinery manufacturer based in Rakovica, Belgrade, Serbia, formerly Yugoslavia. Originally founded in 1927 as Zadrugar, they build tractors and engines. The engines are based on originally licensed Perkins engine models. Some of the tractors were based on Landini and Massey Ferguson models, originally licensed.

In 2009, IMR formed a partnership or joint venture with IMT, also of Serbia. In 2011, IMR began sending CKD tractors to Ethiopia for assembly. They are also sold in Egypt as EAMCO tractors. IMR shut down in 2015 along with IMT but with no plans for bringing it back.

Rakovica model names indicate their horsepower and most of the models had the DV (meaning 4×4, Serbian:Dupla Vuča) option. The most popular model is the 65, but the model range included:

60, 65, 76, Super series with redesigned bodies (47, 65, 76),120/135 (which had ZF transmissions), limited production 65 12 BS and 75 12 BS tractors.

Over the years, they also made some concept tractors, which included:

Rakovica 50 DV (Re-styled Goldoni tractor), Rakovica Transporter (also a re-styled Goldoni vehicle) and Rakovica R110 Turbo.

References

Manufacturing companies based in Belgrade
Manufacturing companies established in 1927
Serbian brands
1927 establishments in Serbia
Agricultural machinery manufacturers of Serbia
Tractor manufacturers of Serbia

Companies of Serbia
Manufacturing companies disestablished in 2015
2015 disestablishments in Serbia